Haris Bukva (born 15 March 1988) is an Austrian retired professional footballer of Bosnian descent and current head coach of Union Schlierbach.

He formerly played for SV Pasching, SK Austria Kärnten, SK Sturm Graz and was on loan to FC Wels, FC Kärnten and LASK Linz. He made his Hajduk debut on 14 September in a 2–0 home win against Dinamo Zagreb, assisting both goals from a corner kick. In February 2016, he had a very short spell at German fourth tier side BV Cloppenburg.

Career

Club career
Bukva has both Austrian and Bosnian-Herzegovinian citizenship. He began his career in the youth of LASK Linz. In 2005 he was promoted into the first team squad. In 2006 he moved to SV Pasching in the Austrian Football Bundesliga. In the same year he also made his debut with the Pasching team. Bukva was the loaned for one year to FC Wels in the Regionalliga Mitte.

In 2007 he signed a contract with the newly founded club SK Austria Kärnten. Bukva was also a cooperation player for FC Kärnten until it was dissolved in 2009. On 1 June 2009, he moved to SK Sturm Graz until the end of the 2013 season. During the 2010/11 winter break, Bukva joined LASK Linz on loan until the end of the season.

From 2014 to 2015 he played for German 3. Liga club FC Rot Weiß Erfurt. During the summer break of 2015, Bukva moved to SV Austria Salzburg. In mid-January 2016, he terminated his contract with the Salzburgers. On 4 February 2016, BV Cloppenburg, at that time playing in the Regionalliga Nord, announced the commitment of the winger. Bukvas left just a few hours after signing the contract, preferring to return to his Austrian homeland. His long-time advisor Thomas Dorawa, blamed those responsible for the club in Cloppenburg for the rapid departure of Bukva, who was the bearer of hope for the club in danger of relegation. After another four months without a club, Bukva joined the Austrian third division club ATSV Stadl-Paura at the beginning of July 2016.

He then played his first competitive game on July 16, 2016, when he was on the pitch for the full length of the game when his team lost 1–0 in the first round match of the ÖFB Cup 2016/17 against FC Blau-Weiß Linz. Under head coach Mayrleb, Bukva was used in 14 of the 16 possible league games until the winter break. He missed one game due to a yellow-red suspension and another due to a yellow-card suspension. He was mostly used in central midfield, but also played games in the central defense; in his 14 league appearances, he remained goalless and contributed a single assist. During the winter break, Bukva joined WSC Hertha Wels.

International career
The winger took part in the 2007 UEFA European Under-19 Championship in Austria and was eliminated with the team in the preliminary round.

Bukva played nine games for the Austrian U-21 national team during 2008–2009.

Coaching career
In December 2017 he began working as a player-coach at Union Peuerbach. At the beginning of May 2018, Union Peuerbach announced that it would be parting with him because, from their point of view, he had acted too little as a player-coach.

In July 2018, Union Schlierbach announced that they had hired Bukva as their new head coach.

References

External links
 Profile at T-Online 

1988 births
Living people
People from Foča
Bosnia and Herzegovina emigrants to Austria
Austrian footballers
Austrian expatriate footballers
SK Sturm Graz players
LASK players
HNK Hajduk Split players
FC Rot-Weiß Erfurt players
ATSV Stadl-Paura players
Austrian Football Bundesliga players
Croatian Football League players
3. Liga players
Expatriate footballers in Germany
Expatriate footballers in Croatia
Austrian expatriate sportspeople in Germany
Austrian expatriate sportspeople in Croatia
Association football midfielders